Ernest Henry "Ernie" Smith (October 11, 1899 to April 6, 1973), was a Major League Baseball shortstop who played in  with the Chicago White Sox. He batted and threw right-handed. Smith had a .241 batting average in 24 games, 19 hits in 79 at-bats, in his one-year career.

He was born in Totowa, New Jersey and died in Brooklyn, New York. His birth name was Ernest Henry Schmidt.

External links

1899 births
1973 deaths
Chicago White Sox players
Major League Baseball shortstops
Baseball players from New Jersey
Minor league baseball managers
McAlester Miners players
Kansas City Blues (baseball) players
Enid Harvesters players
Bartlesville Bearcats players
Ardmore Bearcats players
Little Rock Travelers players
Birmingham Barons players
Minneapolis Millers (baseball) players
Dallas Steers players
Memphis Chickasaws players
New Orleans Pelicans (baseball) players
Fort Worth Cats players
Jersey City Skeeters players
People from Totowa, New Jersey
Sportspeople from Passaic County, New Jersey
Burials at Long Island National Cemetery